In law, an abstract is a brief statement that contains the most important points of a long legal document or of several related legal papers.

Abstract of title

The abstract of title, used in real estate transactions, is the more common form of abstract. An abstract of title lists all the owners of a piece of land, a house, or a building before it came into possession of the present owner. The abstract also records all deeds, wills, mortgages, and other documents that affect ownership of the property. An abstract describes a chain of transfers from owner to owner and any agreements by former owners that are binding on later owners.

Patent law
In the context of patent law and specifically in prior art searches, searching through abstracts is a common way to find relevant prior art document to question to novelty or inventive step (or non-obviousness in United States patent law) of an invention. Under United States patent law, the abstract may be called "Abstract of the Disclosure".

References

External links 
 , defining the requirements regarding the abstract in an international application filed under Patent Cooperation Treaty (PCT)

Legal research